Clifton Park is a suburban town in Saratoga County, New York, United States. According to the United States Census Bureau, the 2020 population was 38,029. The name is derived from an early land patent.

History
The Indigenous Mohawks and Mohicans referred to the area as Canastigione, meaning corn flats. The first settlements in what is now Clifton Park were established in the 17th century. The town or area was named in 1707 by Nanning Harmansen. At that time, Nanning Harmansen sent letters to Lord Cornbury requesting letters of Patent for Land he bought from the Indigenous Americans. He also stated in this correspondence that he wanted the patent to be known by "Your name of Cliftons Park", and the patent was named the Clifton Park Patent. The Iroqouis name for the Clifton Park Patent was Shenendehowa (meaning "Great Plains") which is where the school district derives gets its name.

The area along the Mohawk River was popular for ferries across the waterbed, with Eldert Vischer opening the crossing known as Vischer Ferry in 1783. To the northwest, Edward Rexford established Rexford Flats, a small community on the riverbank at the northern end of what became NY 146B.

In 1828, the town of Clifton Park was created as "Clifton" from the town of Halfmoon, but was renamed Clifton Park a year later. It was the last town created in Saratoga County. The town originally consisted of farmland with a small village of homes, churches and businesses on what is now U.S. Route 9, but saw a large demographic change when Interstate 87 was built through the town in 1961.

The Grooms Tavern Complex was listed on the National Register of Historic Places in 2000. The Mohawk Valley Grange Hall was added in 2012.

Geography

The town's southern boundary is defined by the Mohawk River and is the border between Saratoga County and Schenectady and Albany counties.

Interstate 87 (the "Adirondack Northway") and U.S. Route 9 pass through the eastern part of the town. New York State Route 146 is an east–west highway through most of the center of Clifton Park until it takes a 90 degree turn southward, passing east of the hamlet of Rexford and then crossing the Rexford bridge into the Town of Niskayuna in Schenectady County.

Demographics

As of the census of 2008, there were over 37,707 people, 13,782 households, and 10,077 families residing in the town. There were 14,262 housing units. The racial makeup of the town was 92.2% White, 2.0% African American, 0.02% Native American, 3.4% Asian, 0.02% Pacific Islander, 0.36% from other races, and 1.6% from two or more races.

There were 13,782 households, out of which 35.7% had children under the age of 18 living with them, 63.8% were married couples living together, 6.2% had a female householder with no husband present, and 26.9% were non-families. 21.8% of all households were made up of individuals, and 6.8% had someone living alone who was 65 years of age or older. The average household size was 2.73 and the average family size was 3.23.

In the town, the age distribution of the population shows 27% under the age of 20, 5.5% from 20 to 24, 15.9% from 25 to 44, 26.1% from 45 to 64, and 12.3% who were 65 years of age or older. The median age was 38.2 years. For 18 and older, there were 49.2% males and 50.8% females.

The median income for a household in the town was $82,850, and the median income for a family was $98,275. Males had a median income of $68,417 versus $46,948 for females. The per capita income for the town was $37,405. About 1.4% of families and 2.9% of the population were below the poverty line, including 2.9% of those under age 18 and 2.8% of those age 65 or over.

Recreation
There are many opportunities for youth involvement in typical sports teams such as football, baseball, softball, lacrosse, soccer, basketball, wrestling and hockey. Adults may participate as well. Every year Clifton Park Soccer Club hosts an international tournament called the Rose and Kiernan/Clifton Park Soccer International Soccer Classic.

Clifton Park also periodically hosts the Babe Ruth World Series for boys baseball. There are also other annual events, such as Winterfest.

Clifton Common which is located on Vischer Ferry Rd. is a central hub for recreation which features baseball/softball fields, soccer fields, outdoor basketball courts, two NHL-size ice rinks, playgrounds, and an outdoor stage for performing arts.

The Vischer Ferry Nature and Historic Preserve, a 740-acre site in southern Clifton Park adjacent to the Mohawk River, features a network of walking trails alongside an original section of the Erie Canal and towpath.

Schools
The public school district covering most (the eastern two-thirds) of Clifton Park is the Shenendehowa Central School District, located on NY Route 146. In addition, the Burnt Hills-Ballston Lake Central School District and the Niskayuna Central School District cover the northwest and southwest corners of Clifton Park respectively.

With a student body of over 9,800 students in eight elementary schools, three middle schools, and two high schools, Shenendehowa Central Schools is one of the largest school districts in New York State. Shenendehowa Central Schools' achievements include twenty-two New York State Championship titles for their Men's Soccer team as well as two National Championships. Their Cross Country team has won six NYS Federation Men's Cross Country Championships.

Shenendehowa schools:

Elementary schools:
Karigon and Orenda (connected), Tesago and Skano (connected), Okte, Chango, Arongen, and the newest addition, Shatekon

Middle schools (all connected): Gowana, Acadia, Koda

High schools: High School West (9th grade only) and High School East (10-12 grades only)

Although there are two different high schools, they are allowed to participate in the same clubs and events (with few exceptions, such as dances and activities during school hours.)

Communities and locations in Clifton Park
Ballston Lake – A hamlet in the northwestern part of Clifton Park, located at the south end of a lake named Ballston Lake.
Clifton Gardens – A neighborhood and census-designated place in the eastern part of the town.
Clifton Knolls-Mill Creek – A neighborhood and census-designated place southeast of the center of town.
Clifton Park Center – A hamlet in the vicinity of town hall. The Clifton Park Center Baptist Church and Cemetery was listed on the National Register of Historic Places in 2004.
Colonie Reservoir – A reservoir in the southern section  of the town.
Country Knolls – A hamlet and census-designated place on the town's northern border, near Round Lake.
Elnora – A hamlet north of Clifton Park Center hamlet on NY 146A.  The Smith's Grain and Feed Store was listed on the National Register of Historic Places in 2012.
Flagler Corners – A hamlet east of Clifton Park Center.
Grooms Corners – A hamlet in the southwestern part of the town on County Road 91. The Grooms Tavern Complex and Mohawk Valley Grange Hall are listed on the National Register of Historic Places.
Jonesville – A hamlet north of Elnora on County Road 82.
Rexford – A hamlet near the western town line and the Mohawk River.
Round Lake – A lake, the southern part of which is in the northeastern corner of the town.
Ushers – A location south of Round Lake on the Clifton Park-Halfmoon border.
Vischer Ferry – A hamlet on County Road 92, located near the Mohawk River in the southern section of Clifton Park.

Notable people
 Emma Lee Benedict (1857-1937), editor, educator, author
 Keith Raniere, cult leader.

See also

 Shenendehowa United Methodist Church

References

External links

  Clifton Park Town Hall
  Saratoga County Chamber of Commerce
  Early history of Clifton Park
 The Chamber of Southern Saratoga County

Towns in Saratoga County, New York
1707 establishments in the Province of New York